Edgar L Davey (1927-2012), was a South African international lawn bowler.

Bowls career
He won a silver medal in the triples at the 1972 World Outdoor Bowls Championship in Worthing with Joe Marsh and Doug Watson. He also won a silver medal in the team event (Leonard Trophy).

He was the 1971 South African National Bowls Championships singles winner bowling for Florida BC, Western Transvaal.

Personal life
He was a sales representative by trade and took up bowls in 1948.

References

1927 births
2012 deaths
South African male bowls players